Karimabad-e Olya (also Romanized as Karīmābād-e ‘Olyā) is a village in Milanlu Rural District, in the Central District of Esfarayen County, North Khorasan Province, Iran. At the 2006 census, its population was 154, in 35 families.

References 

Populated places in Esfarayen County